is a train station in the town of Koumi, Minamisaku District, Nagano Prefecture, Japan, operated by East Japan Railway Company (JR East).

Lines
Koumi Station is served by the Koumi Line and is 48.3 kilometers from the terminus of the line at Kobuchizawa Station.

Station layout
The station consists of one ground-level side platform and one island platform connected to the station building by a level crossing.  The station has a Midori no Madoguchi staffed ticket office.

Platforms

History
Koumi Station opened on 11 March 1919.  With the privatization of Japanese National Railways (JNR) on 1 April 1987, the station came under the control of JR East.

Passenger statistics
In fiscal 2015, the  station was used by an average of 199 passengers daily (boarding passengers only).

Surrounding area
Chikuma River
Koumi Town Hall

Bus routes
Koumi Town-Run Bus
For Ota Danchi (This bus stop is located near Chikuma Bus Ōshirokawa bus stop)
Kitaaiki Village-Run Bus
Minamiaiki Village-Run Bus

See also
 List of railway stations in Japan

References

External links

 JR East station information 

Railway stations in Nagano Prefecture
Railway stations in Japan opened in 1919
Stations of East Japan Railway Company
Koumi Line
Koumi, Nagano